Harry Lee "Peanuts" Lowrey (August 27, 1917 – July 2, 1986) was an American outfielder in Major League Baseball who played for the Chicago Cubs (1942–43; 1945–49), Cincinnati Reds (1949–50), St. Louis Cardinals (1950–54) and Philadelphia Phillies (1955).

He was born in Culver City, California and attended Alexander Hamilton High School in Los Angeles. He was nicknamed as a child by an uncle who, remarking on Lowrey's small size, said, "Why, he's no bigger than a peanut." While Lowrey was growing up in Greater Los Angeles, he worked as a child actor on the Our Gang comedies. As a 35-year-old, he was credited for his screen role as a ballplayer, nicknamed "Peanuts," in The Winning Team, a 1952 biography of Grover Cleveland Alexander that starred Ronald Reagan in the title role.

In a 13-season career, Lowrey posted a .273 batting average with 1,177 hits, 37 home runs and 479 RBI in 1,401 games played. In his late career, he became known as one of the top pinch hitters in the Major Leagues.

He missed the 1944 season while serving in the Army with the Military Police unit.  Lowrey was discharged after six months and rejoined the Chicago Cubs in 1945.

Lowrey was the last Cub to have scored a run in the World Series (game 7, 1945) until Kris Bryant scored a run in game 2, 2016.

After a brief managing career in minor league baseball, Lowrey returned to the Major Leagues as a coach with the Phillies (1960–66), San Francisco Giants (1967–68), Montreal Expos (1969), Cubs (1970–71; 1977–81) and California Angels (1972).

Lowrey died in Inglewood, California, at the age of 68 and is buried at Holy Cross Cemetery in Culver City.

References

External links
Peanuts Lowrey - Baseballbiography.com

Retrosheet

 
 
 

1917 births
1986 deaths
20th-century American male actors
American male child actors
Austin Senators players
Baseball players from Los Angeles
Buffalo Bisons (minor league) players
Burials at Holy Cross Cemetery, Culver City
California Angels coaches
Chicago Cubs coaches
Chicago Cubs players
Cincinnati Reds players
Los Angeles Angels (minor league) players
Major League Baseball center fielders
Major League Baseball first base coaches
Major League Baseball outfielders
Major League Baseball left fielders
Major League Baseball third base coaches
Major League Baseball third basemen
Milwaukee Brewers (minor league) players
Moline Plowboys players
Montreal Expos coaches
National League All-Stars
New Orleans Pelicans (baseball) players
Philadelphia Phillies coaches
Philadelphia Phillies players
Ponca City Angels players
St. Joseph Angels players
St. Louis Cardinals players
San Francisco Giants coaches
Seattle Rainiers players
Alexander Hamilton High School (Los Angeles) alumni
Tulsa Oilers (baseball) players
People from Culver City, California